Shanghai Shijie Fanhua Bao was a periodical published in Shanghai, China. The name is often shortened to Fanhua Bao or Shijie Fanhua Bao ("World Vanity Fair" or "The Glittering World").

Li Baojia (Li Boyuan) was the founder. The main editors were Ouyang Gan and Ren Guangjin. It was founded on May 7, 1901. Publication ended on April 22, 1910.

Works serialized
Serialized works include:
 Gengzi Guobian Tanci by Li Baojia
 Officialdom Unmasked by Li Baojia (the first half of the work, serialized there from April 1903 to June 1905.)

Staff
 Li Baojia (contributor and editor)

References
 Doleželová-Velingerová, Milena. "Chapter 38: Fiction from the End of the Empire to the Beginning of the Republic (1897-1916)" in: Mair, Victor H. (editor). The Columbia History of Chinese Literature. Columbia University Press, August 13, 2013. p. 697-731. , 9780231528511.
 Holoch, Donald. "A Novel of Setting: The Bureaucrats" in: Doleželová-Velingerová, Milena (editor). The Chinese Novel at the Turn of the Century (Toronto: University of Toronto Press; January 1, 1980), 9780802054739.
 Idema, Wilt L. "Prosimetric and verse narrative." p. 343-214. In: Kang-i Sun Chang and Stephen Owen (editors). The Cambridge History of Chinese Literature: From 1375. Cambridge University Press, 2010. , 9780521855594.
 PL, "Li Pao-chia." In: Nienhauser, William H. (editor). The Indiana Companion to Traditional Chinese Literature, Part 1. Indiana University Press, 1986. , 9780253329837.

Notes

Newspapers published in Shanghai
Publications established in 1901
1901 establishments in China
1910 disestablishments
Publications disestablished in 1910